James A. Hayes served on the Los Angeles County Board of Supervisors, representing the 4th district, and in the California State Legislature.

Biography
James A. Hayes was born in Fowler, California on December 5, 1921. During World War II he served in the United States Navy. In 1966, he was elected to the California State Assembly and was re-elected twice. He also served on the Long Beach city council and as vice-mayor. After Los Angeles County Supervisor Burton W. Chace died in an automobile accident in 1972, then-Governor Ronald Reagan appointed Hayes to replace him. Hayes was elected outright to the office on November 7, 1972, and re-elected in 1976.  On June 1, 1979, Hayes resigned from office.  Governor Jerry Brown appointed Yvonne Brathwaite Burke to replace him.

Hayes died on August 10, 2000, at the age of 78.

References

1921 births
2000 deaths
California city council members
Mayors of places in California
Los Angeles County Board of Supervisors
Republican Party members of the California State Assembly
20th-century American politicians
People from Fowler, California
United States Navy personnel of World War II